James Kenny  was an Anglican priest.
 
Kenny educated at Trinity College, Dublin. He was Archdeacon of Kilfenora from 1790 until his death in 1822.

References

1822 deaths
Alumni of Trinity College Dublin
18th-century Irish Anglican priests
Archdeacons of Kilfenora
19th-century Irish Anglican priests